Wagga Wagga railway station is a railway station open for passenger services  on the Main South line connecting Sydney and Melbourne. It has been heritage-listed, especially on account of its historical and architectural significance. A museum is on the premises. , two daily passenger trains in each direction served the City of Wagga Wagga.

History
In 1874, the Department of Public Works, Railway Branch, accepted a tender for extension of the Great Southern Railway from Goulburn to Wagga Wagga.

The station opened in 1879 as "South Wagga Wagga", after the Main South line was extended from Bomen,  to the north, serving as the terminus until the line was extended to Gerogery in 1880. It was renamed "Wagga Wagga" in 1882.

In 1917, Wagga Wagga became a junction station when the Tumbarumba line opened as far as Humula; Tumbarumba was reached in 1921. Traffic on the branch dwindled in the late 20th century, and the last train on it ran in 1987.

Features 
The station building, categorised as a New South Wales Government Railways Type 5 made of first-class brick, and a two-storey Type 4 brick stationmaster's residence, were completed in 1879. In 1917, a refreshment room was added for the journey to Albury. A footbridge from Station Place to Railway Street was completed in 1936. The station yard had a turntable, a tripod crane and extensive sidings, including to an offsite fuel depot and grain silos, but they were removed to leave only a passing loop and short stand-by loop in use. The station no longer has freight handling facilities.

Passenger services
, Wagga Wagga was served by two daily NSW TrainLink XPT services in each direction operating between Sydney and Melbourne. NSW TrainLink also operated road coach services to Tumbarumba, Griffith, Echuca, and to Tumut, a trial service .

Heritage listing 
The property was added to the New South Wales State Heritage Register in 1999 as the "Wagga Wagga Railway Station and yard group". It was assessed as historically, architecturally, scientifically and socially rare, possessing uncommon, rare or endangered aspects of the cultural or natural history of New South Wales. Situated across the high end of Wagga Wagga's main thoroughfare, it was considered to be an important civic element of the city.

The highly significant station building is unique in the New South Wales railway system. It was the first building to have been designed by notable engineer, John Whitton. The station master's residence was assessed as of equal significance to the station building, adding to the completeness of the group with its location near the station entrance. Other buildings, excellent examples of their type, also reflect the importance of the location as a former junction.

See also 

List of railway stations in New South Wales

References

Bibliography

Attribution

External links

Wagga Wagga station details Transport for New South Wales

Easy Access railway stations in New South Wales
Railway stations in Australia opened in 1879
Regional railway stations in New South Wales
Wagga Wagga
New South Wales State Heritage Register
Museums in New South Wales
Articles incorporating text from the New South Wales State Heritage Register
Wagga Wagga
Main Southern railway line, New South Wales